Melodinus fusiformis is a species of plant in the family Apocynaceae. It is native to China (Guangdong, Guangxi, Guizhou), Indochina, and the Island of Luzon in the Philippines.

References

fusiformis
Flora of China
Flora of Indo-China
Flora of Luzon
Plants described in 1852
Vulnerable plants
Taxonomy articles created by Polbot
Taxobox binomials not recognized by IUCN